The Congridae are the family of conger and garden eels. Congers are valuable and often large food fishes, while garden eels live in colonies, all protruding from the sea floor after the manner of plants in a garden (thus the name). The family includes over 180 species in 32 genera.

Congrids are found in tropical, subtropical and temperate seas around the world. Clear distinguishing features among congrids are few; they all lack scales, and most possess pectoral fins. They feed on crustaceans and small fish, and unlike some other eels, do not migrate to breed.

Genera
Family Congridae

 Subfamily Bathymyrinae
 Ariosoma (27 species)
 Bathymyrus (three species)
 Chiloconger (two species)
 Kenyaconger (one species)
 Parabathymyrus (five species)
 Paraconger (seven species)
 Subfamily Congrinae
 Acromycter (five species)
 Bassanago (four species)
 Bathycongrus (22 species)
 Bathyuroconger (two species)
 Blachea (two species)
 Castleichthys (one species)
 Conger (14 species)
 Congrhynchus (one species)
 Congriscus (three species)
 Congrosoma (one species)
 Diploconger (one species)
 Gnathophis (27 species)
 Japonoconger (three species)
 Lumiconger (one species)
 Macrocephenchelys (two species)
 Poeciloconger (one species)
 Promyllantor (three species)
 Pseudophichthys (one species)
 Rhynchoconger (seven species)
 Scalanago (one species)
 Uroconger (four species)
 Xenomystax (five species)
 Subfamily Heterocongrinae (garden eels)
 Gorgasia (14 species)
 Heteroconger (21 species)

See also
List of fish families

References

 
Marine fish families
Eels
Ray-finned fish families